Sam Ligtlee (born 12 December 1997) is a Dutch track cyclist. In 2018, he won the bronze medal in the men's 1 km time trial event at the 2018 UEC European Track Championships.

References

External links
 

1997 births
Living people
Dutch male cyclists
European Games competitors for the Netherlands
Cyclists at the 2019 European Games
UCI Track Cycling World Champions (men)
People from Brummen
Cyclists from Gelderland
21st-century Dutch people